The Livny Uprising in August 1918 was one of the first peasant insurrections to arise against the Russian Soviet Socialist Republic.

The uprising, in which about 10 thousand people took part, was caused by the peasants' rejection of the policy of war communism and requisitioning by the Bolsheviks, and the intelligentsia's rejection of the complete transfer of power into the hands of the Bolsheviks. The culmination of the peasant uprising was the capture of the town of Livny by the rebels, which they held for less than two days. The uprising was suppressed with the help of reinforcements sent from Oryol.

History
Livny was a city surrounded by wheat-producing territories, in the middle of the trade routes between Moscow, Kursk, Voronezh and Oriol. There were also a small dairy and flour-producing industries and a railway repair shop. Most of the inhabitants were villagers, of whom 70% were poor, 20% lived between misery and some prosperity and 10% were kulaks.

After the October Revolution, the Bolsheviks easily took control of Oriol Oblast, where the city of Livny was. They tried to win the support of the rural population by founding Poor Peasant Committees to govern them, which was strongly resisted. The final spark was given by the forced seizure of grain carried out within the framework of war communism, which initiated a policy of ruthless persecution against all opponents and punishments against any village that resisted.

At the beginning of August 1918 Ivan Klyopov, a Left SR and former Soviet official, led a local peasant revolt against Bolshevik rule. A force of 10,000  to 12,000 villagers  stormed Livny on 18 August. The Bolsheviks in the city were barely 200 plus two machine guns; they resisted but had to retreat to the train station, which was besieged and fell the next day.

On 20 August Cheka forces, international brigades, a cavalry squadron, two infantry detachments and an armored train armed with a 3-inch cannon and two machine guns, arrived from Oriol. They reached Livny, dispersed the mob that confronted them, arrested and shot several leaders. Reports speak of at least 70 Bolsheviks and 300 rebels killed. Klyopov was able to escape but was never heard from again.

This uprising is often considered a bunt, a brief, punctual and insignificant revolt. However, it was a sign of a war brewing between the peasantry and the new Soviet state. Large-scale rebellions in the countryside began only a year later, and the real war between the two began after the defeat of the White Movement in 1920.

See also
 Green armies
 Tambov Rebellion
 Makhnovist Revolution

References

Bibliography

Literature

Further reading 
 
 
 
 

Peasant revolts
Russian Civil War
20th-century rebellions
Anti-Bolshevik uprisings
Political repression in Russia
Rebellions in Russia
1918 in Russia
Conflicts in 1918
Oryol Oblast